David Goodman (born 1846) was a private in the United States Army and a recipient of America's highest military decorationthe Medal of Honorfor his actions in the Indian Wars of the western United States.

Biography
Goodman was born in 1846 in Paxton, Massachusetts and served in Company L, 8th U.S. Cavalry as a private. On October 14, 1869, he was awarded the Medal of Honor for bravery during the skirmishes with the Apache Indians at Lyry Creek, Arizona.

Medal of Honor citation
Rank and organization: Private, Company L, 8th U.S. Cavalry.
Place and date: At Lyry Creek, Arizona Territory, 14 October 1869.
Entered service at: Unknown.
Birth: Paxton, Massachusetts.
Date of issue: 3 March 1870.

Citation:

The President of the United States of America, in the name of Congress, takes pleasure in presenting the Medal of Honor to Private David Goodman, United States Army, for bravery in action on 14 October 1869, while serving with Company L, 8th U.S. Cavalry, in action at Lyry Creek, Arizona Territory.

See also

List of Medal of Honor recipients for the Indian Wars

References

External links

1846 births
Year of death missing
American people of the Indian Wars
United States Army Medal of Honor recipients
United States Army soldiers
People from Paxton, Massachusetts
American Indian Wars recipients of the Medal of Honor